Diana Guardato was a member of the aristocratic Patrician Guardato family, and had at least two children with King Ferdinand I:
 Ferdinando d' Aragona y Guardato, 1st Duke of Montalto, who married 1st, Anna Sanseverino, 2nd, Castellana de Cardona whose daughter Maria d'Aragona, married Antonio Todeschini Piccolomini, Duke of Amalfi, a nephew of Pope Pius II and brother of Pope Pius III.
 Giovanna d' Aragona, who married Leonardo della Rovere, Duke of Arce and Sora, a nephew of Pope Sixtus IV and brother of Pope Julius II.

References

15th-century Italian nobility
Italian royalty
Diana